The Atami Jinsha Tetsudo (Jap. for Atami man(powered) vehicle railway) was a  long  manpowerered narrow gauge railway in the province of Izu, Japan which was operated around 1900.

The train crew comprised two men and a boy. The men, muscular coolies, pushed the car on the up-grades and jumped on the rear platform for a ride when the car was coasting on a level or down-grade. The boy rode on the front platform, and it was his duty to blow a horn as a warning at hills and curves, and to manipulate the brakes. The fare, including tips for the crew, on the road was equivalent to 21 cents per round trip.

The line closed in 1923 as a result of the Great Kanto earthquake.

Photographs

References 

Railway lines in Japan
Rail transport in Shizuoka Prefecture
narrow gauge railways in Japan